Harold Bradley (1926–2019) was an American country and pop guitarist.

Harold Bradley may also refer to:

Sports
 Harold Bradley (basketball) (1911–1985), American college basketball coach
 Harold Bradley Sr. (1905–1973), American football player
 Harold Bradley Jr. (1929–2021), American football player and Italian actor

Others
 Harold Bradley (pianist) (1906–1984), Canadian pianist
 Harold Bradley (trade unionist) (1895–1979), British trade union leader
 Harold C. Bradley (1878–1976), professor in biochemistry at the University of Wisconsin

See also
 Harry Bradley (disambiguation)